Roy Allen Smith (born December 12, 1954, in Cedar City, Utah) is an American animator, film director and producer, who is well known for the Land Before Time series and Family Guy.

Filmography

Film

Television

External links

1954 births
People from Cedar City, Utah
American animators
American animated film directors
American television directors
American animated film producers
American television producers
American film producers
American storyboard artists
Living people
Film directors from Utah